Thomas Treffry (fl. 1545) was an English politician.

He was a Member of Parliament (MP) for Bodmin in 1545.

References

Year of birth missing
Year of death missing
People from Bodmin
Members of the pre-1707 English Parliament for constituencies in Cornwall
English MPs 1545–1547